A bird stamp is a postage stamp that illustrates one or more birds. It is a popular theme in topical stamp collecting.

Birds started appearing on stamps by 1875, when Japan issued a series of three stamps bearing stylized illustrations of the three species Motacilla alba, Accipiter gentilis and bean goose. The first United States bird stamp, depicting an eagle with wings outspread, was issued in 1869  on Scott #116 and #121, on stamps that were issued for general mail usage. The UK issued its first in honor of "Nature Week" in 1963. As of 2003, over 10,000 bird stamps had been issued around the world.

A prominent collector is Chris Gibbins whose collection of over twelve thousand stamps portrays about three thousand species.  Organisations that cover this field include the American Topical Association and The Bird Stamp Society.

References and sources
Notes

Sources

BIRDS ON STAMPS

External links
Birds of the World on Postage Stamps – Chris Gibbins' collection online

Birds on stamps
Topical postage stamps